Scenes from the Class Struggle in Beverly Hills is a 1989 American black comedy film co-written and directed by Paul Bartel. The film re-unites Bartel with his Eating Raoul co-stars Mary Woronov and Robert Beltran. It also stars Jacqueline Bisset, Ray Sharkey, Ed Begley Jr., Wallace Shawn, Paul Mazursky, and Rebecca Schaeffer. Schaeffer's appearance in the film served as the catalyst for her murder one month after its release.

Plot
Recently widowed Clare, a former television sitcom star, invites her next-door neighbor Lisabeth to stay with her while Lisabeth's house is fumigated. Lisabeth's brother Peter, a playwright, arrives with his new bride To-Bel, an African-American woman. To-Bel had a fling in Hawaii with Howard, Lisabeth's ex-husband, who shows up unexpectedly and begs Lisabeth to take him back. (To-Bel — who had no idea she slept with Lisabeth's ex-husband before marrying her brother — describes the coincidence as "a freaky little act of God.")

Clare's Chicano manservant Juan owes $5,000 in gambling debts to June-Bug, an Asian gangster. When he is unable to collect the debt, June-Bug slashes Juan's cheek as a warning to pay up. Juan turns to Lisabeth's chauffeur, Frank, for help. Frank bets he can seduce Clare before Juan can bed Lisabeth. Frank agrees to pay $5,000 if Juan wins — on the condition Juan sleeps with him if he loses. Juan accepts Frank's challenge. Frank, unable to seduce Clare, laces her drink with sedatives and tricks Juan into thinking he bedded her. Juan sleeps with Lisabeth but denies it to avoid tarnishing her reputation. Juan honors the bet and sleeps with Frank.

Howard and Lisabeth's teenage son, Willie, has cancer which is in remission. After he confides to Juan he had a wet dream, Juan loans him porno tapes and encourages him to masturbate. To Willie's surprise, To-Bel appears as a leather-clad dominant in one of the tapes. The tape inadvertently gets mixed up with one of Clare's old sitcom episodes. When Clare shows it to guests after Sidney's wake — not realizing the tape is pornographic — To-Bel quickly cuts the power to avoid embarrassment. When Willie gives her the tape, To-Bel is so grateful that she agrees to help him lose his virginity by sleeping with him.

Clare attempts a comeback soon after her husband Sidney dies (though she is haunted by his ghost). She suffers from bulimia and enlists help from Mo, a paunchy Beverly Hills weight loss doctor. She invites a reporter for brunch to write a feature about her comeback. The brunch is a disaster: everyone exposes their partners' infidelity or gleefully reveals their own sexual indiscretions. After Clare's housekeeper Rosa frightens her with Aztec philosophy cloaked in New Age babble, the reporter abruptly leaves and Clare accuses everyone of sabotaging her comeback.

Mo persuades Clare and Sidney's much younger daughter, Zandra, to accompany him to Africa —  ostensibly on a hunger project, though he warns her they will share a tent there. After Peter sleeps with Clare, To-Bel and Howard rekindle their relationship and leave together. Juan and Lisabeth fall in love and book a romantic holiday. As their limousine is about to leave, June-Bug returns, but Frank gives Juan the money to repay his debt. Sidney's ghost appears again to pester Clare. After she persuades him she must undergo self-improvement alone, Sidney's ghost vanishes for good.

Cast
 Jacqueline Bisset as Clare Lipkin
 Ray Sharkey as Frank
 Mary Woronov as Lisabeth Hepburn-Saravian
 Robert Beltran as Juan
 Ed Begley Jr. as Peter
 Wallace Shawn as Howard
 Arnetia Walker as To-Bel
 Paul Bartel as Dr. Mo Van De Kamp
 Paul Mazursky as Sidney Lipkin
 Rebecca Schaeffer as Zandra
 Barret Oliver as Willie Saravian
 Edith Diaz as Rosa
 Jerry Tondo as June-Bug
 Michael Feinstein as himself
 Frank Welker as special vocal effects (voice only)
Cast notes:
 Little Richard appears in the film uncredited.

Awards
Woronov was nominated for a 1989 Independent Spirit Award for Best Supporting Female for her role.

Home media
Scenes from the Class Struggle in Beverly Hills was released on Region 2 German DVD on May 18, 2005 and in Italy with its Italian title, Scene di lotta di classe a Beverly Hills. It was released on DVD and Blu-ray in the United States from Kino Lorber on June 30, 2020.

In popular culture
The 1996 The Simpsons episode "Scenes from the Class Struggle in Springfield" parodies the title of this film.

References

External links
 
 
 
 

1989 films
1980s black comedy films
1989 LGBT-related films
American black comedy films
American LGBT-related films
American satirical films
American sex comedy films
Films directed by Paul Bartel
Films scored by Stanley Myers
Films set in Los Angeles
American independent films
Male bisexuality in film
LGBT-related black comedy films
LGBT-related sex comedy films
1989 comedy films
1980s English-language films
1980s American films